Angie is a novel by Slovenian author Janja Vidmar. It was first published in  2007.

See also
List of Slovenian novels

Slovenian novels
2007 novels